Historical method is the collection of techniques and guidelines that historians use to research and write histories of the past. Secondary sources, primary sources and material evidence such as that derived from archaeology may all be drawn on, and the historian's skill lies in identifying these sources, evaluating their relative authority, and combining their testimony appropriately in order to construct an accurate and reliable picture of past events and environments.

In the philosophy of history, the question of the nature, and the possibility, of a sound historical method is raised within the sub-field of epistemology. The study of historical method and of different ways of writing history is known as historiography.

Source criticism 

Source criticism (or information evaluation) is the process of evaluating the qualities of an information source, such as its validity, reliability, and relevance to the subject under investigation.

Gilbert J. Garraghan and Jean Delanglez divide source criticism into six inquiries:

 When was the source, written or unwritten, produced (date)?
 Where was it produced (localization)?
 By whom was it produced (authorship)?
 From what pre-existing material was it produced (analysis)?
 In what original form was it produced (integrity)?
 What is the evidential value of its contents (credibility)?

The first four are known as higher criticism; the fifth, lower criticism; and, together, external criticism.  The sixth and final inquiry about a source is called internal criticism. Together, this inquiry is known as source criticism.

R. J. Shafer on external criticism: "It sometimes is said that its function is negative, merely saving us from using false evidence; whereas internal criticism has the positive function of telling us how to use authenticated evidence."

Noting that few documents are accepted as completely reliable, Louis Gottschalk sets down the general rule, "for each particular of a document the process of establishing credibility should be separately undertaken regardless of the general credibility of the author".  An author's trustworthiness in the main may establish a background probability for the consideration of each statement, but each piece of evidence extracted must be weighed individually.

Procedures for contradictory sources 
Bernheim (1889) and Langlois & Seignobos (1898) proposed a seven-step procedure for source criticism in history:

 If the sources all agree about an event, historians can consider the event proven.
 However, majority does not rule; even if most sources relate events in one way, that version will not prevail unless it passes the test of critical textual analysis.
 The source whose account can be confirmed by reference to outside authorities in some of its parts can be trusted in its entirety if it is impossible similarly to confirm the entire text.
 When two sources disagree on a particular point, the historian will prefer the source with most "authority"—that is the source created by the expert or by the eyewitness.
 Eyewitnesses are, in general, to be preferred especially in circumstances where the ordinary observer could have accurately reported what transpired and, more specifically, when they deal with facts known by most contemporaries.
 If two independently created sources agree on a matter, the reliability of each is measurably enhanced.
 When two sources disagree and there is no other means of evaluation, then historians take the source which seems to accord best with common sense.

Subsequent descriptions of historical method, outlined below, have attempted to overcome the credulity built into the first step formulated by the nineteenth century historiographers by stating principles not merely by which different reports can be harmonized but instead by which a statement found in a source may be considered to be unreliable or reliable as it stands on its own.

Core principles for determining reliability 
The following core principles of source criticism were formulated by two Scandinavian historians, Olden-Jørgensen (1998) and Thurén Torsten (1997):

 Human sources may be relics such as a fingerprint; or narratives such as a statement or a letter. Relics are more credible sources than narratives.
 Any given source may be forged or corrupted. Strong indications of the originality of the source increase its reliability.
 The closer a source is to the event which it purports to describe, the more one can trust it to give an accurate historical description of what actually happened.
 An eyewitness is more reliable than testimony at second hand, which is more reliable than hearsay at further remove, and so on.
  If a number of independent sources contain the same message, the credibility of the message is strongly increased.
 The tendency of a source is its motivation for providing some kind of bias. Tendencies should be minimized or supplemented with opposite motivations.
  If it can be demonstrated that the witness or source has no direct interest in creating bias then the credibility of the message is increased.

Eyewitness evidence 
R. J. Shafer offers this checklist for evaluating eyewitness testimony:

 Is the real meaning of the statement different from its literal meaning?  Are words used in senses not employed today?  Is the statement meant to be ironic (i.e., mean other than it says)?
  How well could the author observe the thing he reports?  Were his senses equal to the observation?  Was his physical location suitable to sight, hearing, touch?  Did he have the proper social ability to observe: did he understand the language, have other expertise required (e.g., law, military); was he not being intimidated by his wife or the secret police?
 How did the author report?, and what was his ability to do so?
 Regarding his ability to report, was he biased?  Did he have proper time for reporting?  Proper place for reporting?  Adequate recording instruments?
 When did he report in relation to his observation?  Soon?  Much later?  Fifty years is much later as most eyewitnesses are dead and those who remain may have forgotten relevant material.
 What was the author's intention in reporting?  For whom did he report?  Would that audience be likely to require or suggest distortion to the author?
  Are there additional clues to intended veracity?  Was he indifferent on the subject reported, thus probably not intending distortion?  Did he make statements damaging to himself, thus probably not seeking to distort?  Did he give incidental or casual information, almost certainly not intended to mislead?
  Do his statements seem inherently improbable: e.g., contrary to human nature, or in conflict with what we know?
  Remember that some types of information are easier to observe and report on than others.
  Are there inner contradictions in the document?

Louis Gottschalk adds an additional consideration: "Even when the fact in question may not be well-known, certain kinds of statements are both incidental and probable to such a degree that error or falsehood seems unlikely.  If an ancient inscription on a road tells us that a certain proconsul built that road while Augustus was princeps, it may be doubted without further corroboration that that proconsul really built the road, but would be harder to doubt that the road was built during the principate of Augustus.  If an advertisement informs readers that 'A and B Coffee may be bought at any reliable grocer's at the unusual price of fifty cents a pound,' all the inferences of the advertisement may well be doubted without corroboration except that there is a brand of coffee on the market called 'A and B Coffee.'"

Indirect witnesses 
Garraghan says that most information comes from "indirect witnesses", people who were not present on the scene but heard of the events from someone else.  Gottschalk says that a historian may sometimes use hearsay evidence when no primary texts are available.  He writes, "In cases where he uses secondary witnesses...he asks: (1) On whose primary testimony does the secondary witness base his statements?  (2) Did the secondary witness accurately report the primary testimony as a whole?  (3) If not, in what details did he accurately report the primary testimony?  Satisfactory answers to the second and third questions may provide the historian with the whole or the gist of the primary testimony upon which the secondary witness may be his only means of knowledge.  In such cases the secondary source is the historian's 'original' source, in the sense of being the 'origin' of his knowledge.  Insofar as this 'original' source is an accurate report of primary testimony, he tests its credibility as he would that of the primary testimony itself." Gottschalk adds, "Thus hearsay evidence would not be discarded by the historian, as it would be by a law court merely because it is hearsay."

Oral tradition 
Gilbert Garraghan maintains that oral tradition may be accepted if it satisfies either two "broad conditions" or six "particular conditions", as follows:

 Broad conditions stated.
 The tradition should be supported by an unbroken series of witnesses, reaching from the immediate and first reporter of the fact to the living mediate witness from whom we take it up, or to the one who was the first to commit it to writing.
 There should be several parallel and independent series of witnesses testifying to the fact in question.
 Particular conditions formulated.
 The tradition must report a public event of importance, such as would necessarily be known directly to a great number of persons.
 The tradition must have been generally believed, at least for a definite period of time.
 During that definite period it must have gone without protest, even from persons interested in denying it.
 The tradition must be one of relatively limited duration.  [Elsewhere, Garraghan suggests a maximum limit of 150 years, at least in cultures that excel in oral remembrance.]
 The critical spirit must have been sufficiently developed while the tradition lasted, and the necessary means of critical investigation must have been at hand.
 Critical-minded persons who would surely have challenged the tradition – had they considered it false – must have made no such challenge.

Other methods of verifying oral tradition may exist, such as comparison with the evidence of archaeological remains.

More recent evidence concerning the potential reliability or unreliability of oral tradition has come out of fieldwork in West Africa and Eastern Europe.

Anonymous sources 

Historians do allow for the use of anonymous texts to establish historical facts.

Synthesis: historical reasoning 
Once individual pieces of information have been assessed in context, hypotheses can be formed and established by historical reasoning.

Argument to the best explanation 
C. Behan McCullagh lays down seven conditions for a successful argument to the best explanation:

The statement, together with other statements already held to be true, must imply yet other statements describing present, observable data.  (We will henceforth call the first statement 'the hypothesis', and the statements describing observable data, 'observation statements'.)
The hypothesis must be of greater explanatory scope than any other incompatible hypothesis about the same subject; that is, it must imply a greater variety of observation statements.
The hypothesis must be of greater explanatory power than any other incompatible hypothesis about the same subject; that is, it must make the observation statements it implies more probable than any other.
The hypothesis must be more plausible than any other incompatible hypothesis about the same subject; that is, it must be implied to some degree by a greater variety of accepted truths than any other, and be implied more strongly than any other; and its probable negation must be implied by fewer beliefs, and implied less strongly than any other.
The hypothesis must be less ad hoc than any other incompatible hypothesis about the same subject; that is, it must include fewer new suppositions about the past which are not already implied to some extent by existing beliefs.
It must be disconfirmed by fewer accepted beliefs than any other incompatible hypothesis about the same subject; that is, when conjoined with accepted truths it must imply fewer observation statements and other statements which are believed to be false.
It must exceed other incompatible hypotheses about the same subject by so much, in characteristics 2 to 6, that there is little chance of an incompatible hypothesis, after further investigation, soon exceeding it in these respects.

McCullagh sums up, "if the scope and strength of an explanation are very great, so that it explains a large number and variety of facts, many more than any competing explanation, then it is likely to be true".

Statistical inference 
McCullagh states this form of argument as follows:

There is probability (of the degree p1) that whatever is an A is a B.
It is probable (to the degree p2) that this is an A.
Therefore, (relative to these premises) it is probable (to the degree p1 × p2) that this is a B.

McCullagh gives this example:

In thousands of cases, the letters V.S.L.M. appearing at the end of a Latin inscription on a tombstone stand for Votum Solvit Libens Merito.
From all appearances the letters V.S.L.M. are on this tombstone at the end of a Latin inscription.
Therefore, these letters on this tombstone stand for Votum Solvit Libens Merito.

This is a syllogism in probabilistic form, making use of a generalization formed by induction from numerous examples (as the first premise).

Argument from analogy 
The structure of the argument is as follows:

One thing (object, event, or state of affairs) has properties p1 . . .  pn and pn + 1.
Another thing has properties p1 . . . pn.
So the latter has property pn + 1.

McCullagh says that an argument from analogy, if sound, is either a "covert statistical syllogism" or better expressed as an argument to the best explanation.  It is a statistical syllogism when it is "established by a sufficient number and variety of instances of the generalization"; otherwise, the argument may be invalid because properties 1 through n are unrelated to property n + 1, unless property n + 1 is the best explanation of properties 1 through n. Analogy, therefore, is uncontroversial only when used to suggest hypotheses, not as a conclusive argument.

See also 
Antiquarian
Archaeology
Archival research
Auxiliary sciences of history
Chinese whispers
Historical criticism
Historical significance
Historiography
List of history journals
Philosophy of history
Recorded history
Scholarly method
Scientific method
Source criticism
Unwitting testimony

Footnotes

References 
Gilbert J. Garraghan, A Guide to Historical Method, Fordham University Press: New York (1946). 
Louis Gottschalk, Understanding History: A Primer of Historical Method, Alfred A. Knopf: New York (1950). .
Martha Howell and Walter Prevenier, From Reliable Sources: An Introduction to Historical Methods, Cornell University Press: Ithaca (2001). .
C. Behan McCullagh, Justifying Historical Descriptions, Cambridge University Press: New York (1984). .
R. J. Shafer, A Guide to Historical Method, The Dorsey Press: Illinois (1974). .

External links 
Introduction to Historical Method by Marc Comtois
Philosophy of History by Paul Newall
Federal Rules of Evidence in United States law

Historiography
Methodology